Sir Henry Caesar (2 October 1630 – 6 January 1668 ) was an English politician who sat in the House of Commons in 1660 and 1666 through 1668.

Caesar was the son of Sir Charles Caesar, by his wife Jane Barkham, and succeeded to the estate of Bennington, Hertfordshire, in 1642. He was admitted at Jesus College, Cambridge, on 10 June 1646 and admitted at Inner Temple in 1647.
 
In 1660, Caesar was elected Member of Parliament for Hertfordshire in the Convention Parliament. He regained his seat in Cavalier Parliament in a by-election in April 1666. He was knighted on 7 July 1660.

Caesar married Elizabeth (1630 - 1670) daughter of Robert Angell a merchant of London by his wife Susan Bateman, on 6 November 1649 at St Olave, Hart Street, London.

Caesar died of smallpox in 1668 at the age of 37. He was survived by his son Charles who became a member of parliament and his daughter Jane wife of Sir Thomas Pope Blount, 1st Baronet.

References

1630 births
1668 deaths
English MPs 1660
Alumni of Jesus College, Cambridge
Members of the Inner Temple
People from East Hertfordshire District
Deaths from smallpox
Members of the Parliament of England for Hertfordshire
English MPs 1661–1679
Infectious disease deaths in England
English people of Italian descent
Knights Bachelor
Caesar family